Hewitsonia beryllina, the green tiger blue, is a butterfly in the family Lycaenidae. It is found in Nigeria (the Cross River loop), western Cameroon and the Republic of the Congo. The habitat consists of forests.

References

Butterflies described in 1916
Poritiinae
Butterflies of Africa